The Saheeh International translation is an English-language translation of the Quran that has been used by Islam's most conservative adherents. Published by the Publishing House (dar), dar Abul Qasim, Saudi Arabia, it is one of the world's most popular Quran translations.

Translated by three American women, Umm Muhammad (Emily Assami), Mary Kennedy, and Amatullah Bantley, it uses un-archaic language. Notable conventions include rendering the God in Islam as Allah as they believe it is not acceptable to use the English word. 

The translation has been described as biased towards "Sunni orthodoxy," which, according to authors, requires words to be inserted in square parentheses. The translation has become the main version used in English-language propaganda put out by ISIS. It has also been sponsored and promoted by Saudi Arabia's Wahhabi ideology. For those reasons, it has been defined as an ultraconservative translation.

Ṣaḥīḥ may be translated as "authentic" or "sound."

Translators
Emily Assami was born in California into an atheist family. She was married to an Arab husband. She studied Arabic at Damascus University. She converted to Islam and is known as Umm Muhammad or Aminah.

Mary Kennedy was born in Orlando. She was a former Christian who converted to Islam.

Amatullah Bantley was a former Catholic Christian. She was introduced to Islam through international Muslim students. She converted to Islam in 1986 and eventually moved to Saudi Arabia.

See also 
 The Qur'an with Annotated Interpretation in Modern English
 English translations of the Quran

References

External links
 THE QUR'AN Saheeh International

 
English translations of the Quran